Take Us to the Start is the first full-length studio album by American pop-rock singer-songwriter Matt Hires, released exclusively through iTunes on July 15, 2009 and then released August 25, 2009 on Atlantic Records.

The digital-only release hit the top 10 on iTunes' "Top Albums" chart, despite only being available in a digital format, the album debuted at No. 96 on the Billboard 200 albums chart and No. 16 on the digital downloads chart.

All songs were written or co-written by Matt Hires and his long-time producer Eric Rosse (Sara Bareilles, Tori Amos). Matt has also collaborated with some noted songwriters, including Emmy Award nominated songwriter and novelist Harry Shannon, Indie singer-songwriter Gus Black, Gregg Wattenberg – who co-produced Train's quadruple platinum hit "Hey, Soul Sister" and Daughtry's platinum single "It's Not Over", he also co-wrote the song "You in the End" with Sara Bareilles.

An exclusive iTunes deluxe version of the album includes additional three bonus demo tracks, music video of "Honey, Let Me Sing You a Song", and a digital booklet.

Background

Reading before songwriting

Recording Process

Song co-writing

Notable song information

Honey, Let Me Sing You a Song

State Lines

Turn The Page

O Sunrise

You in the End

Out of the Dark

Hurricane (Demo)

Track listing

Reception

Critical response
The album has earned advance critical praise and received generally favorable reviews from most music critics.
People Magazine hailed the collection, noting "on the opening cut of his debut, Hires requests, 'Honey, Let Me Sing You a Song'. With his folky pop and aching croon, how could you deny him?"

Creative Loafing commended the album as "crafted and interesting, full of sincerity and catchy melodies highlighted by (Hires') enveloping, gravelly tenor."

On Andrew Leahey's review: "'Take Us to the Start' sounds best at its most brisk, when Hires trades the coffeehouse aspirations of his slower songs for something more akin to driving, mainstream pop/rock. The bulk of this debut album is filled with semi-ballads, though, whose leisurely pace allows Hires more room to indulge a bit too heavily in the influence of his Hotel Café contemporaries."

This Is Modern said: "His debut album is so fully awesome that you will be hard pressed to find a track that you don't enjoy, ...Hires has put together one of the best debut albums by any singer/songwriter and will be rewarded by well deserved recognition and success."

Chart performance
Take Us to the Start debuted at No. 96 on Billboard 200 albums chart based on only digital download, also charted No. 16 on Billboard Digital Albums.

Uses in media
Songs from the album have appeared on several TV series and in films. The series Grey's Anatomy used "Out Of The Dark" in the season 6 episode "I Saw What I Saw"; "Turn The Page" appeared in the season five episode "An Honest Mistake", and "O Sunrise" turned up in another episode. NBC's Cougar Town has included the songs "Honey, Let Me Sing You a Song" and "Turn The Page". "Honey" also appeared in the pilot episode of Life Unexpected on The CW, and "O Sunrise" played during the episode "Truth Unrevealed". "A Perfect Day" is heard in the season two episode "Acceptance" of Private Practice, and is used in the trailer for the 2010 film When in Rome. The demo version of "Honey" is featured on the When in Romes soundtrack album. "Turn The Page" also shows up in the trailer for the 2009 film The Boys Are Back.

Album credits
Performance credits
Matt Hires – Vocals; Acoustic Guitar; Background Vocals; Crowd Noise; Human Whistle
Sara Bareilles – Background Vocals
Matt Chamberlain – Drums
Chris Chaney – Bass
Aaron Sterling – Drums
Chris Reynolds – Percussion

Technical credits
Stephen Marcussen – Mastering
Chris Reynolds – Engineer, Digital Editing
Carolyn Tracey – Package Production
Kristie Borgmann – Art Manager
Chris Stang – Marketing

Additional credits
Reid Rolls – Photography
Zachariah Mattheus – Art Direction; Design

References 

2009 debut albums
Matt Hires albums
Atlantic Records albums